The Italy men's national volleyball team represents the country in international competitions and friendly matches. The national team is controlled by the Italian Volleyball Federation, the governing body for Volleyball in Italy. It is one of the most successful national teams in the history of volleyball, having won four World Championships (1990, 1994, 1998 and 2022), seven European Championships, one World Cup (1995) and eight World League (1990, 1991, 1992, 1994, 1995, 1997, 1999 and 2000). Italy is the reigning World champion, having won 2022 FIVB Volleyball Men's World Championship.

Result history

Golden Team
In 1989, Julio Velasco was hired to coach the Italian National Men's Team. He immediately led them to a gold medal at the European Championships in 1989, which his team won twice more in 1993 and 1995. The team also won a silver medal at the World Cup in 1989.
He de-emphasized the specialization trend of the 1980s. He emphasized the concept of the “square”, team unity where the team was better than the sum of its players. He was meticulous, well prepared and very demanding, but he knew how to win.
Starting at the 1990 World Championships and the 1990 Goodwill Games, the Italian National team swept the world volleyball events for five years. They won a gold medal in the World Championships in 1990 and 1994, the World League in 1990, 1991, 1992, 1994 and 1995, 1991, the Mediterranean Games, and the 1993 Grand Champions Cup. They won a silver medal at the Olympic Games. Julio Velasco left the Italian National Men's Team in 1996. Velasco in 1989-1996 created Golden Team with Players such as Zorzi, Andrea Gardini, Giani, Bernardi, Gravina, Bracci, Tofoli, Lucchetta, Papi, Pasinato and Meoni.

Olympic Games
 Champions   Runners up   Third place   Fourth place

World Championship
 Champions   Runners up   Third place   Fourth place

  1990 —  Gold medal
 Anastasi, Bernardi, Bracci, Cantagalli, De Giorgi, Gardini, Giani, Lucchetta, Martinelli, Masciarelli, Tofoli, Zorzi. Head Coach: Velasco
  1994 —  Gold medal
 Bernardi, Bracci, Cantagalli, Gardini, Giani, De Giorgi, Giretto, Gravina, Papi, Pippi, Tofoli, Zorzi. Head Coach: Velasco
  1998 —  Gold medal
 Bracci, Corsano, Fei, Gardini, Giani, De Giorgi, Gravina, Meoni, Papi, Pasinato, Rosalba, Sartoretti. Head Coach: Bebeto
  /  2022 —  Gold medal
 Anzani, Balaso, Bottolo, Galassi, Giannelli, Lavia, Michieletto, Mosca, Pinali, Recine, Romanò, Russo, Sbertoli, Scanferla. Head Coach: De Giorgi

World Cup

 Champions   Runners up   Third place   Fourth place

  1995 —  Gold medal

World Grand Champions Cup

 Champions   Runners up   Third place   Fourth place

  1993 —  Gold medal
 Bracci, Galli, Gardini, Giani, Gravina, Zorzi, Cantagalli, Bellini, Pippi, Pasinato, Bernardi. Head Coach: Velasco

World League

 Champions   Runners up   Third place   Fourth place

  1990 Osaka —  Gold medal
 Gardini, Margutti, De Giorgi, Tofoli, Masciarelli, Anastasi, Bracci, Bernardi, Cantagalli, Zorzi, Lucchetta, Giazzoli, Pasinato, Petrelli, Martinelli, Loro, Gallia. Head coach: Velasco
  1991 Milan —  Gold medal
 Gardini, Martinelli, Margutti, De Giorgi, Tofoli, Masciarelli, Anastasi, Bracci, Bernardi, Cantagalli, Zorzi, Lucchetta, Giazzoli, Pasinato, Petrelli, Lombardi, Gallia, Galli, Gravina. Head coach: Velasco
  1992 Genoa —  Gold medal
 Gardini, Martinelli, Margutti, De Giorgi, Tofoli, Masciarelli, Galli, Bracci, Bernardi, Cantagalli, Zorzi, Lucchetta, Giani, Giazzoli, Pasinato. Head coach: Velasco
  1994 Milan —  Gold medal
 Gardini, Martinelli, Gravina, De Giorgi, Tofoli, Papi, Sartoretti, Bracci, Bernardi, Cantagalli, Margutti, Pippi, Giani, Bellini, Pasinato, Rinaldi, Fangareggi, Giretto. Head coach: Velasco
  1995 Rio de Janeiro —  Gold medal
 Fangareggi, Rosalba, Gravina, De Giorgi, Botti, Papi, Sartoretti, Verniaghi, Giazzoli, Bonati, Radicioni, Pippi, Giani, Bellini, Pasinato, Bovolenta, Meoni, Giretto. Head coach: Velasco
  1997 Moscow —  Gold medal
 Gardini, Meoni, Gravina, Bendani, Fangareggi, Papi, Giombini, Sartoretti, Casoli, Rosalba, Zlatanov, Pippi, Giani, Bovolenta, Bonati, Patriarca, Bellini. Head coach: de Freitas
  1999 Mar del Plata —  Gold medal
 Vermiglio, Meoni, Mastrangelo, Fei, Papi, Sartoretti, Casoli, Rosalba, Zlatanov, Corsano, Bellini, Bovolenta, Giombini, Molteni. Head coach: Anastasi
  2000 Rotterdam —  Gold medal
 Gardini, Meoni, Gravina, Mastrangelo, Tofoli, Papi, Sartoretti, Bracci, Bernardi, Rosalba, Molteni, Corsano, Giani, Fei, Castellano, Bovolenta, Giombini, Vermiglio. Head coach: Anastasi

Nations League

 Champions   Runners up   Third place   Fourth place

European Championship

 Champions   Runners up   Third place   Fourth place

  1989 —  Gold medal
 Anastasi, Bernardi, Bracci, Cantagalli, De Giorgi, Gardini, Lucchetta, Margutti, Masciarelli, Passani, Tofoli, Zorzi. Head Coach: Velasco
  1993 —  Gold medal
 Bellini, Bracci, Cantagalli, Galli, Gardini, Giani, Gravina, Martinelli, Pasinato, Pippi, Tofoli, Zorzi. Head Coach: Velasco
  1995 —  Gold medal
 Bernardi, Bovolenta, Bracci, Cantagalli, Gardini, Giani, Gravina, Meoni, Papi, Pasinato, Tofoli, Andrea Zorzi. Head Coach: Velasco
  1999 —  Gold medal
 Bracci, Corsano, Gardini, Giani, Giombini, Gravina, Meoni, Mastrangelo, Papi, Rosalba, Sartoretti, Tofoli. Head Coach: Anastasi
  2003 —  Gold medal
 Biribanti, Černič, Cozzi, Fei, Giani, Mastrangelo, Meoni, Papi, Pippi, Sartoretti, Savani, Vermiglio. Head Coach: Montali
   2005 —  Gold medal
 Černič, Cisolla, Corsano, Cozzi, Fei, Łasko, Mastrangelo, Paparoni, Savani, Sintini, Tencati, Vermiglio. Head Coach: Montali
  2021 —  Gold medal
 Anzani, Balaso, Bottolo, Cortesia, Galassi, Giannelli, Lavia, Michieletto, Piccinelli, Pinali, Ricci, Recine, Romanò, Sbertoli. Head Coach: De Giorgi

European Games

 Champions   Runners up   Third place   Fourth place

Mediterranean Games
1959 —  gold medal
1963 —  silver medal
1975 —  silver medal
1979 — Fourth place
1983 —  gold medal
1987 —  bronze medal
1991 —  gold medal
1997 — Fourth place
2001 —  gold medal
2005 — Fifth place
2009 —  gold medal
2013 —  gold medal
2018 —  gold medal
2022 —  bronze medal
2026 — Future event

Goodwill Games
 Champions   Runners up   Third place   Fourth place

 1990 —  Gold medal

Team

Current roster
The following is the Italian roster in the 2022 FIVB Volleyball Men's World Championship.

Head coach:  Ferdinando De Giorgi

Coach history
Pietro Bernardi (1947)
Angelo Costa (1947-1949)
Renzo Del Chicca (1949-1953)
Ivan Trinajstic (1953-1966)
Josef Kozak (1966-1969)
Odone Federzoni (1969-1974)
Odone Federzoni & Josef Kozak (1970)
Franco Anderlini (1974-1976)
Adriano Pavlica (1976-1977)
Edward Skorek (1978 ad interim)
Carmelo Pittera (1978-1982 + 1988)
Nino Cuco (1981 ad interim)
Silvano Prandi (1983-1986)
Aleksander Skiba (1987)
Michelangelo Lo Bianco (1988 ad interim)
Julio Velasco (1988-1996)
Angelo Frigoni (1990-1991 ad interim - World League)
Daniele Bagnoli (1992 ad interim - World League)
Paulo Roberto de Freitas (1996-1998)
Andrea Anastasi (1998-2002)
Kim Ho-Chul (2001)
Gian Paolo Montali (2002-2007)
Andrea Anastasi (2007-2010)
Mauro Berruto (2010-2015)
Gianlorenzo Blengini (2015-2021)
Antonio Valentini (2021 - Volley Nations League)
Ferdinando De Giorgi (2021-)

Record attendance
 Table updated to August 12, 2012.

Kit providers
The table below shows the history of kit providers for the Italy national volleyball team.

Sponsorship
Primary sponsors include: main sponsors like DHL, Kinder (Ferrero SpA), Honda and Mizuno, other sponsors: Santal, Diadora, EthicSport, Reaxing, Crai, Nutrilite, Uliveto and Winform.

Media
Italy's matches and friendlies are currently televised by RAI and Rai Sport.

References

External links

Official website
FIVB profile

National men's volleyball teams
Volleyball in Italy
Men's volleyball in Italy
World champion national volleyball teams
Volleyball